Neel Jani (born 8 December 1983) is a Swiss professional Porsche factory driver. His father is from India and his mother is German Swiss.

He achieved his greatest success winning the 24 Hours of Le Mans in 2016 after first joining Porsche's LMP1 programme for the 2014 season driving in the WEC. Previously, Jani drove for A1 Team Switzerland in A1 Grand Prix, helping them win the 2007-2008 title and finishing runner-up in 2005-06 and 2008–09. He raced for PKV Racing in the North American Champ Car series in 2007. He is also a GP2 Series race-winner and former Formula One test driver.

He joined Formula E's Faraday Future Dragon Racing squad for the 2017/2018 season but left the team after one weekend. For the 2019-20 Formula E season, he returned with his home brand Porsche with teammate Andre Lotterer.

First steps
Born in Rorschach, Jani started his career in karting in 1998 where he stayed for two years before moving up to Formula Renault 2000 Eurocup in 2001. In the same year, he also raced some races in Italian Formula Renault. He stayed in both for 2002, again only racing part of the Italian Formula Renault season. In 2003, he moved to Formula Renault V6 Eurocup, driving for the Jenzer team. In that year, he finished second by only four points in the championship with Jenzer Motorsport. In 2004, he again raced in the Formula Renault V6 Eurocup but changed team, running with the French team DAMS, stating in the Swiss press, "This year, it is win or nothing." He finished fourth in the championship that year, while his old team, Jenzer Motorsport finished second with their rookie driver Ryan Sharp.

GP2
In 2005, he raced in the GP2 Series with Racing Engineering alongside Borja García who he generally outperformed. He won two races, at the Hungaroring and at Monza. He also managed to lead most of the Nürburgring race in a clearly slower car with some effective defensive driving.

In 2006, he replaced injured Nicolas Lapierre in the Silverstone and Magny-Cours races for English race team Arden. By doing this, he also secured his place in the record books, being the only person to ever drive in both GP2 and F1 on the same day.

A1 Grand Prix

He then raced in the new A1 Grand Prix series, representing his home nation with A1 Team Switzerland. In the inaugural season of A1GP, the team earned the silver medal for second place, with Jani consistently finishing on the podium, including a win at the Dubai Autodrome of the 2005-06 United Arab Emirates Sprint race.

After leaving the first two rounds of the 2006-07 season  to Sébastien Buemi, Jani win another 2006–07 Malaysia Sprint race.

Jani drove all the races for Switzerland in the 2007-08 season, taking the championship with four wins and 168 points. The team finished second in the 2008-09 season, again with Jani ever-present.

Formula One

He was linked to a reserve F1 seat with the Sauber team. In 2004 however, he moved back to GP2 the following year. In December 2005 he was confirmed as Scuderia Toro Rosso's third driver, alongside race drivers Scott Speed and Vitantonio Liuzzi, a role he held throughout the 2006 season, before departing to pursue a Champ Car career. For the 2008 F1 season, Neel was linked with the test driving role at Red Bull Racing. As his father is from India, Jani was linked to the proposed Indian-backed buyout of BMW Sauber but this did not succeed.  In early 2010 he tested for Force India and was rumoured to be involved with the team in 2010. However Force India signed Mercedes driver Paul di Resta as their test and reserve driver.

Champ Car
For 2007, Jani drove for the PKV Racing team in the Champ Car World Series.  He ended the series in ninth place with a total of 231 points. After choosing to focus on the 2007-2008 A1GP season rather than stay in ChampCar for 2008, the series was absorbed by the IRL.

Sports car racing
In 2010, Jani became affiliated with Swiss privateer Rebellion Racing and teamed with Nicolas Prost to race a Lola-Judd LMP1 at the Le Mans Series and 24 Hours of Le Mans, finishing 2nd at Algarve and 5th at Silverstone. Also, he raced the second half of the FIA GT1 season for Matech in a Ford GT, finishing 7th in a championship race and 8th in other two.

Jani took up full-time WEC racing in 2012 with Rebellion, teaming with Prost and Nick Heidfeld for two seasons, before joining the Porsche works team in 2014 and winning his first LMP1 race at São Paulo, Brazil, finishing third overall in the championship. The 2015 season saw Jani take another win at Bahrain in addition to 5 runner-up spots; again he finished third in the championship.

Jani kicked off the 2016 WEC season with a win at Silverstone and a second place at Spa before inheriting the win at the 24 Hours of Le Mans in dramatic fashion when Kazuki Nakajima's Toyota broke down in the lead with only one lap to go in the race.

Return to single-seaters: Formula E 
On 24 August 2017, it was announced that Jani would make his debut in FIA Formula E Championship in its fourth season at Faraday Future Dragon Racing with Jérôme d'Ambrosio as his teammate. After two 18th-place finishes at the season opener in Hong Kong, Jani abruptly quit the team focusing instead on his WEC commitments with Rebellion Racing.

In December 2018, Porsche announced that Jani would return to the championship as part of their driver line-up for their maiden season. He raced for Porsche with teammate Andre Lotterer till the end of the 2019–20 season, finishing twentieth on the standings. For the 2020-21 Formula E Championship, he was replaced by Pascal Wehrlein.

Personal life
Jani and his wife Lauren have a son.

Career results

Complete A1 Grand Prix results
(key) (Races in bold indicate pole position) (Races in italics indicate fastest lap)

Complete GP2 Series results
(key) (Races in bold indicate pole position) (Races in italics indicate fastest lap)

Formula One
(key)

American Open Wheel
(key) (Races in bold indicate pole position, races in italics indicate fastest race lap)

Champ Car

Complete 24 Hours of Le Mans results

Complete GT1 World Championship results

Complete Superleague Formula results
(key) (Races in bold indicate pole position) (Races in italics indicate fastest lap)

† Non Championship round

Le Mans Series results

Complete FIA World Endurance Championship results

American Le Mans Series results

Complete IMSA SportsCar Championship results

Complete Formula E results
(key) (Races in bold indicate pole position; races in italics indicate fastest lap)

References

External links

 
 

1983 births
Living people
Swiss racing drivers
People from Rorschach, Switzerland
Italian Formula Renault 2.0 drivers
French Formula Renault 2.0 drivers
Formula Renault Eurocup drivers
Formula Renault V6 Eurocup drivers
GP2 Series drivers
A1 Team Switzerland drivers
Champ Car drivers
24 Hours of Le Mans drivers
24 Hours of Le Mans winning drivers
Swiss people of Indian descent
European Le Mans Series drivers
Formula Lista Junior drivers
American Le Mans Series drivers
FIA GT1 World Championship drivers
Olympiacos CFP (Superleague Formula team) drivers
Porsche Supercup drivers
FIA World Endurance Championship drivers
Formula E drivers
Swiss people of German descent
WeatherTech SportsCar Championship drivers
Jenzer Motorsport drivers
DAMS drivers
Arden International drivers
KV Racing Technology drivers
Rebellion Racing drivers
Porsche Motorsports drivers
Dragon Racing drivers
Swiss Formula One drivers
Sportspeople from the canton of St. Gallen
A1 Grand Prix drivers
Porsche Formula E Team drivers
Racing Engineering drivers
Chip Ganassi Racing drivers
Asian Le Mans Series drivers